The 1. FC Nürnberg II is the reserve team of German football club 1. FC Nürnberg, from the city of Nuremberg, Bavaria.

Until 2005, the team played under the name of 1. FC Nürnberg Amateure.

History

1955–1963
Nürnberg's amateur team first won promotion to Bavarias highest football league, then the tier-three Amateurliga Nordbayern, in 1955, when it took out the title in the 2. Amateurliga Mittelfranken-Süd and came second in the following promotion round. The Amateurliga Nordbayern was then one of two leagues at this level in Bavaria, covering the northern half of the state while the Amateurliga Südbayern existed in parallel in the south.

1. FC Nürnberg Amateure, as the team was then known as, was the first reserve side to reach this level, pre-dating the FC Bayern Munich II by a year. The team finished in sixth place out of fourteen in its first year in the third division. It dropped to thirteenth in the following year, three points save of relegation. After an eighth place in 1957–58, a fourteenth the following season meant relegation back to the fourth division. The team remained at this level until 1963, when, in the reorganisation of the German football league system, it became part of the new tier-four Landesliga Bayern-Mitte.

1963 to 1973
After coming fifth in the Landesliga in 1963–64, the team won the league the season after and earned promotion to the Amateurliga Bayern, now operating as a single division and statewide. In this league, commonly referred to as the Bayernliga, it managed a second place in its first year there, two points behind champions BC Augsburg. As the third division was the highest league reserve teams were permitted in Germany, Nürnberg could not have been promoted anyway, even if it had won the league.

The team's performances gradually fell off, year-by-year, finishing fifth, seventh, tenth and thirteenth until 1970. In the 1969–70 season, it escaped relegation by only two points. Nuremberg continued to struggle against relegation and, in 1973, finished last in the league, fourteen points clear of salvation.

1973–1987
Back in the Landesliga, the team played as an upper-table side, improving again season-by-season. The 1977–78 season was a step backwards however, with the side finishing eleventh and only one point clear of a relegation rank. While the following year was an improvement, 1979–80 became an outstanding one, winning the league and promotion by earning 61 of a possible 68 points.

In a repeat of 1965–66, the team once more finished runners-up in the league in its first year back, this time to MTV Ingolstadt. Decline came much quicker this time, the side struggling against relegation from then on and by 1983, Nürnberg was relegated again. It won the Landesliga title once more the year after and returned to the Bayernliga.

The team spend the next three seasons at this level before suffering another relegation in 1987, when it finished last. One place and one point above it, the senior team of local rival SpVgg Fürth went down alongside.

1987–1998
A considerably longer spell of Landesliga football followed now for the side. In 1990–91, it finished on top of the table, on equal points with SpVgg Fürth, losing the following championship decider. In the following promotion round, which it was qualified for as the runners-up, it lost 1–0 to Landesliga Bayern-Süd runners-up FC Gundelfingen, condemning the team to stay in the Landesliga. In most other seasons before and after, the team finished in sixth and seventh place. In 1996, with the relegation of Nürnberg's first team to the third division for the first time in its history, the side was renamed 1. FC Nürnberg II, since the first team was not playing in a fully professional league anymore and was therefore considered Amateure themselves. This lasted for only one season, 1. FCN returning to the 2. Bundesliga in 1997. Its reserve team followed this upward trend the year after, finishing second in the league and advancing through the promotion round.

1998–2008
The team returned to the Bayernliga, now only the fourth tier of the league system, as a more competitive side then when it left eleven years before, finishing seventh in its first year there. It continued to be an upper-table side for the years to come, finishing second three times, in 2001, 2004 and 2006. In 2001, it was only one win away from winning the championship and promotion, finishing three points behind fellow Middle Franconian club SpVgg Ansbach.

In 2004, TSV 1860 Munich II beat them by a point, while, in 2006, an eleven points gap to champions FC Ingolstadt 04 was a much more obvious result.

In 2005, 1. FC Nürnberg Amateure was permanently renamed 1. FC Nürnberg II, as were all reserve sides of first and second Bundesliga teams.

In the 2007–08 season, the team finished third, becoming one of six Bayernliga clubs to be promoted to the Regionalliga Süd in the league reform that went alongside the creation of the 3. Liga.

2008–present
From 2008 onwards, 1. FCN II played in the tier-four Regionalliga Süd. After four seasons in this league with a second place in 2009–10 as the best result the club became part of the newly formed Regionalliga Bayern in 2012. In its first two seasons there the club finished fourth and eighth respectively.

Honours
Regionalliga Süd (IV)
Runners-up: 2010
Bayernliga (III-IV)
Runners-up: (5) 1966, 1981, 2001, 2004, 2006
Landesliga Bayern-Mitte (IV)
Champions: (3) 1965, 1980, 1984
Runners-up: (2) 1991, 1998
 2nd Amateurliga Mittelfranken Süd (IV)
 Champions: (2) 1955, 1963
Mittelfranken Cup
Winner: (3) 1995, 2001, 2006

Current squad

From Under 19

Recent managers
Recent managers of the club:

Recent seasons
The recent season-by-season performance of the club:

With the introduction of the Bezirksoberligas in 1988 as the new fifth tier, below the Landesligas, all leagues below dropped one tier. With the introduction of the Regionalligas in 1994 and the 3. Liga in 2008 as the new third tier, below the 2. Bundesliga, all leagues below dropped one tier. With the establishment of the Regionalliga Bayern as the new fourth tier in Bavaria in 2012 the Bayernliga was split into a northern and a southern division, the number of Landesligas expanded from three to five and the Bezirksoberligas abolished. All leagues from the Bezirksligas onward were elevated one tier.

DFB Cup appearances
The club has qualified for the first round of the German Cup a number of times. Since 2008 however, reserve teams are not eligible to compete in the German Cup anymore:

References

External links 
Official team site
1. FCN II on the official team site
1. FC Nürnberg II profile at Weltfussball.de
Das deutsche Fußball-Archiv historical German domestic league tables 

German reserve football teams
Bavarian reserve football teams
 
1. FC Nurnberg II
Football in Middle Franconia